Daman Airport  is a military airbase at Daman in the union territory of Dadra and Nagar Haveli and Daman and Diu. It is home to the Indian Coast Guard Air Station, Daman which provides ATC and parking facilities to Defence as well as civilian aircraft.

History 
Daman Airport was built in the 1950s by the Government of Portuguese India. The 
TAIP (Portuguese India Airlines) commenced operations to Daman on 29 August 1955. TAIP linked Daman with Goa, Diu and Karachi until December 1961, when Daman was liberated by the Indian Armed Forces, with TAIP ceasing operations.

The Indian Coast Guard deployed its first Dornier Squadron at Daman in January 1987 followed by its first full-fledged Air Station in October 1987.

Structure 

Daman Airport has two intersecting asphalt runways.

The main runway 03/21 is 5910 ft (1801 m) long and 45 m wide while the secondary runway 10/28 is 3284 ft (1001 m) long and 25 m wide. The airport is equipped with Airport Surveillance Radar (ASR), Precision Approach Path Indicator (PAPI), Doppler Very High Frequency Omnidirectional Radio Range (DVOR) – Distance Measuring Equipment (DME) and Non-Directional Beacon (NDB), as navigation aids.

Indian Coast Guard Air Station 
The station has two squadrons under its administrative and operational control.
750 SQN (ICG) operating Dornier 228 aircraft
841 SQN (ICG) operating Chetak helicopters
The station also caters for maritime reconnaissance and SAR coverage along the north west coast. Dornier and Chetak aircraft are detached from Daman for operational commitments along the coast. Conduct of adventurous activities is a regular feature. For that the station is equipped with one micro light aircraft and one power glider. The training for Sea Cadet Corps are undertaken at the air station.

Airlines and destinations 
There is no scheduled commercial air service at this time.

External links 

Airports in Dadra and Nagar Haveli and Daman and Diu
Daman, India